Vuelos Internos Privados S.A. (VIP for short) was an Ecuadorian regional airline based at the Old Mariscal Sucre International Airport and headquartered in Quito, Ecuador. It operated domestic and regional services. The airline was a subsidiary of Avianca and part of the AviancaTaca Holding, which was owned by Synergy Group.

History
VIP was founded in 1997 as a charter company rendering services only to associated members. In July 1997, the company started to operate charter flights, transporting passengers and cargo between regional destinations in Ecuador. The airline was also active in charter traffic, including for the oil industry.

In 2001, VIP began operating regular commercial flights. In 2003, it became part of the Synergy Group as part of a strategy to create a continent-wide airline under the Avianca brand, which owns 100% of its stock. 

In October 2011, the airline was managed by AeroGal, who under its own aircraft operated two destinations of the airline, the sales and distribution of tickets were also included in the itineraries and records of the airline that is part of the AviancaTaca Holding alliance. In 2012, VIP ceased operations after it merged with AeroGal.

Destinations

Before VIP ceased operations, the company operated to the following destinations:

Fleet

VIP had formerly consisted the following aircraft:

4 Dornier 328-110
2 Dornier 328-120

See also
Avianca Ecuador
List of defunct airlines of Ecuador

References

External links

Aerogal website (es/en)
VIP website (es/en)

Defunct airlines of Ecuador
Airlines established in 1997
Airlines disestablished in 2012
Defunct companies of Ecuador
1997 establishments in Ecuador
2010s disestablishments in Ecuador
Avianca